Walter E. Cook (December 21, 1888 – October 12, 1955) was a member of the Wisconsin State Assembly.

Biography
Cook was born on December 21, 1888 in Unity, Wisconsin. His brother, George, was a member of the Marathon County, Wisconsin Board of Supervisors. On August 27, 1914, Cook married Minnie Yahr. They had two children. He died on October 12, 1955.

Career
Cook was a member of the Assembly twice. First, from 1939 to 1945 and second, from 1951 until his death. He was a Republican. He also served on the Unity school board as treasurer.

References

People from Unity, Wisconsin
School board members in Wisconsin
Republican Party members of the Wisconsin State Assembly
1888 births
1955 deaths
20th-century American politicians